The second campaign of the Dungeons & Dragons web series Critical Role premiered on January 11, 2018—four months after the conclusion of the first campaign—and concluded on June 3, 2021. The series starred Travis Willingham, Marisha Ray, Taliesin Jaffe, Ashley Johnson, Sam Riegel, Liam O'Brien, and Laura Bailey as the players with Matthew Mercer as the Dungeon Master.

The campaign is an actual play which follows The Mighty Nein, a party of seven adventurers, in their travels across the continent of Wildemount. It occurs at a time of very high tensions between the Dwendalian Empire and the Kryn Dynasty—two of Wildemount's major powers, which are divided by the Ashkeeper Peaks mountain range. Over the course of the campaign, The Mighty Nein work towards rooting out political corruption, especially within the Cerberus Assembly, and establishing peace between the Kryn Dynasty and the Dwendalian Empire after war breaks out. They also thwart apocalyptic threats such as Tharizdûn's attempt to escape his imprisonment and the Somnovem's attempt to return to the Prime Material Plane.

Campaign Two aired each Thursday at 7 p.m. PT on Critical Role Productions' Twitch and YouTube channels. It consisted of 141 episodes with a total run time of over 550 hours. In 2022, the show returned with a two-part special titled The Mighty Nein Reunited. Critical Role won multiple awards during the campaign, such as the 2019 Webby Winner and People's Voice Winner in the "Video Series & Channels – Games" category from the Webby Awards, and the 2019 Audience Honor in the "Games" category from the Shorty Awards. An upcoming animated television adaptation for Amazon Prime Video, titled Mighty Nein, was announced in January 2023.

Cast
Campaign Two featured all eight primary cast members from the end of Campaign One, in addition to occasional guests. Ashley Johnson was absent for several lengthy periods over the first 86 episodes due to her filming schedule for the NBC drama Blindspot, which ran from 2015 to 2020.

Two of the player-characters for this campaign are based on characters their actors had previously created. Jester is based on a character Bailey had portrayed in two one-shot adventures, one with GameSpot and one with Kinda Funny. Mollymauk was originally designed by Jaffe as a possible replacement for Percy, his character in Campaign One, in the event of Percy's death.

Main 

Campaign Two had eight cast members—seven players who form an adventuring party and the Dungeon Master.
Travis Willingham as Fjord Stone, a half-orc warlock who unwittingly makes a pact with a malevolent leviathan named Uk'otoa when he is drowning at sea. After a period of self-discovery, Fjord breaks his pact with Uk'otoa and becomes a follower of the wilderness goddess Wildmother, who also has dominion over the sea, and multiclasses into a paladin.
Marisha Ray as Beauregard "Beau" Lionett, a human monk working for the Order of the Cobalt Soul to root out corruption in the Dwendalian Empire. Beau is initially presented as being resentful of authority and anti-social, and rises to the rank of Expositor to carry out sensitive, covert investigations.
Taliesin Jaffe as: 
 Mollymauk "Molly" Tealeaf, a tiefling blood hunter and con artist working in a traveling circus. Mollymauk is killed when The Mighty Nein attempts to free party members from a slaver group.
 Caduceus Clay, a firbolg cleric in service of the Wildmother, goddess of the wilderness. Caduceus is searching for a way to save his home from a magical blight. The Mighty Nein recruits Caduceus before the party's second attempt to rescue their captured members; he remains with the group because he believes it will aid in his journey.
Ashley Johnson as Yasha Nydoorin, an aasimar barbarian who is exiled from her homeland in Xhorhas for marrying outside the strict arranged-marriage traditions of her clan. She is haunted by her time as the "Orphanmaker" and her involvement in a cult that gave its followers control over her.
Sam Riegel as Nott the Brave, a goblin rogue who escaped jail with Caleb and wishes to support his growing magical potential. She was previously a halfling woman named Veth Brenatto and was cursed to be a goblin after a goblin raiding party captured her family. She is returned to her halfling body in episode 97 and struggles with her conflicting desires to continue adventuring with the Mighty Nein, and to stay with her husband and child.
Liam O'Brien as Caleb Widogast, a human wizard who was enrolled at the Soltryce Academy, the Dwendalian Empire's premier magical school, until he was chosen to train to become an assassin for the Empire. This training was physically and mentally traumatizing, leading to a breakdown. Caleb is known for inventing spells.
Laura Bailey as Jester Lavorre, a tiefling cleric who follows an obscure entity known as the Traveler. Her relationship with the Traveler is temporarily strained when she learns he is not actually a deity as originally claimed, but an archfey named Artagan, a recurring non-player character (NPC) from Campaign One. 
Matthew Mercer as the Dungeon Master, who organizes the gameplay, describes the effects the player characters' actions have on the world and narrative, and plays the NPCs.

Guest 
There were seven guest players for Campaign Two. Though he plays a different character, Chris Perkins is the only guest player who also appeared in Campaign One.
 Khary Payton as Shakäste, a human cleric who aids the party as they investigate a gnoll attack in Alfield.
 Mark Hulmes as Calianna, a half-elf sorcerer who enlists the party to help her find and destroy an artifact.
 Ashly Burch as Keg, a dwarven fighter who joins the party in the fight against the Iron Shepherds.
 Sumalee Montano as Nila, a firbolg druid whose husband and son were taken by the Iron Shepherds
 Deborah Ann Woll as Twiggy, a gnome arcane trickster who stows away aboard the party's ship with a dangerous relic.
 Chris Perkins as Spurt, a kobold inventor who joins the party as they cross into Xhorhas and dies within minutes of his introduction to The Mighty Nein.
 Mica Burton as Reani, an aasimar druid and self-styled protector of Uthodurn who aids the party in their quest to re-forge a legendary sword.

Setting
The campaign is set in Exandria, a fictional world Matthew Mercer created for the game. The second campaign is set about 20 years after Vox Machina's final battle against Vecna in Critical Roles first campaign, and except for a few secondary characters has a new cast of adventurers. Most of the story takes place on the continent of Wildemount, which is located to the east of Tal'Dorei, the setting of the first campaign. It takes place at a time of very high tensions between the Dwendalian Empire and the Kryn Dynasty—two of Wildemount's major powers, which are divided by the Ashkeeper Peaks mountain range—and war is imminent.

Western Wildemount is governed by the Dwendalian Empire and is ruled by King Bertrand Dwendal. A council of powerful archmages called the Cerberus Assembly act as advisors to the House of Dwendal. The Empire regards the region of Xhorhas, which occupies the eastern side of the continent, as an inhospitable wasteland. Xhorhas is governed by the Kryn Dynasty, is ruled by the Bright Queen Leylas Kryn, and is primarily home to the drow and other races considered to be monstrous. The Menagerie Coast occupies the southwestern coastline and is governed by the Clovis Concord, a coalition of eight city-states that includes Nicodranas and Port Damali. The tundra in the northernmost region of Wildemount is known as the Greying Wildlands; the harsh environment leaves it sparsely populated compared with other regions. Some parts of the story take place on the Lucidian Ocean, off the shore of the Menagerie Coast, and on Eiselcross, a frozen continent north of Wildemount.

Production and format
The show aired each Thursday at 19:00 PT on Critical Role's Twitch and YouTube channels. In May 2021, the cast announced Campaign Two would shortly end but "the Mighty Nein's story wasn't finished". Collider reported that the second campaign had aired for over 530 hours, including 100 hours dedicated to battles with "440 slain villains". The finale aired on June 3, 2021; at seven hours it was  also the longest episode of the campaign.

The show's format was initially largely unchanged from the later episodes of the first campaign with videos of the cast and battle maps presented in three-to-five-hour episodes. During the second campaign's run, technical changes to subtitles and character information were introduced. Since February 28, 2019, a D&D Beyond-branded Twitch overlay has been available to viewers using web browsers to watch live. The overlay displays character-status information and allows viewers to access digital character sheets but it is not available on the Video on demand (VOD) channels on Twitch and YouTube. Episodes 1 through 53 were captioned by the same fan group that transcribed Campaign One. From Episode 54 onward, episodes were transcribed live on Twitch by a professional transcription service. The YouTube VOD relied on YouTube's auto-generated captions until the broadcast transcription was reviewed and added "within a week or so of upload". 

Like previous campaign, episodes 1 through 51 were aired live on the Geek & Sundry Twitch and YouTube channels, and on the Legendary Digital Networks' Alpha service. Critical Role Productions separated from Geek & Sundry and Legendary Digital Networks in February 2019. After the split, the Critical Role series ceased to be distributed on Alpha, and live broadcasts and VODs were exclusively distributed on Critical Role's YouTube and Twitch channels. Alpha was shut down several weeks after the split.

Changes during the COVID-19 pandemic
On March 17, 2020, as a result of the COVID-19 pandemic, the show went on an unplanned hiatus. The show returned with the 100th episode of the campaign on July 20, 2020; before then, a video explaining how the production team was implementing the guidelines within the Hollywood White Paper and setting out the social distancing requirements that would be followed was uploaded to Critical Role's YouTube channel. In addition, each cast member had an individual camera and the on-set production team was reduced to a skeleton crew. The show also switched to pre-recorded episodes rather than airing live. These changes were present until the end of the campaign on June 3, 2021.

Post-campaign 
In October 2022, Critical Role announced a two-part special titled The Mighty Nein Reunited. The canonical story begins several months after the conclusion of the second campaign with the cast reprising their roles. Part One aired on November 17, 2022, and Part Two aired on December 1, 2022. The Mighty Nein Reunited was streamed on Twitch and YouTube, and was simulcast at Cinemark Theatres in the United States and South America.

Episodes

2018

2019

2020

2021

Specials

Reception 
Multiple critics recommended the second campaign as the Critical Role series to start with. Dais Johnston, writing for Inverse, commented that the second campaign is the "perfect starting place" as it features "all-new characters and storylines". USA Today highlighted that by having few references to the events of the first campaign makes the second campaign "a great starting point for new viewers who are mostly unfamiliar with the show's timeline".  According to Alexandria Turney of Screen Rant, Campaign One's lower initial quality "can be off-putting", while Campaign Two is "highly recommended" for newcomers, "as it makes it easier to fall in love with the cast, which then makes it easier to go back and watch" Campaign One. Emily Duncan of Tor.com wrote; "the second campaign somehow has a radically different flavor to the first, while still being just as charming and chaotic". On the differences between campaigns, Duncan highlighted that the second campaign has player character death, an ocean based arc and more political tension with two countries close to war with one another leading to difficult "political maneuvers" by the party "to keep the worst from happening". Duncan also commended the setting design for ignoring "the problematic Dungeons and Dragons concept of 'evil races'" with cities inhabited by traditionally monstrous races such as goblins, kobolds, bugbears and Drow.

Critical Role has been credited by VentureBeat as responsible for making actual play shows "their own genre of entertainment", and has since become one of the most prominent actual play series. In December 2018, Chey Scott, for Inlander, wrote; "one of the most popular live-play Dungeons & Dragons web series is Critical Role ... the first episode of the series' current season, which debuted in January 2018, has more than 3.1 million views". In February 2019, Jeremy Thomas of 411Mania highlighted that Critical Role "regularly garners viewership in the tens of thousands each Thursday night. It and its Tuesday discussion show Talks Machina are Geek & Sundry's most popular shows by far, both on Twitch and Legendary's Project Alpha". Andy Wilson, for Bleeding Cool, called Critical Role "the best show I've watched all year" in 2020, and "one of the most-watched" shows on Twitch; he also noted that it had a COVID-19 safe-filming protocol which allowed the show to continue production. Wilson wrote on the importance of giving fans "something to look forward to every week" during the "monotony and despair" of quarantine.  

However, critics emphasized the length of Critical Role as a potential entry barrier to viewers. Both Turney and Johnston called starting the series "daunting" due to the episode lengths. Johnston highlighted that the total runtime of episodes 1-99 is "623 hours (25 days, 23 hours)". Brie Mihele of TheGamer wrote the show's length "can be a huge barrier to starting" the show as Critical Role has produced new content every week "for the past two years" and that watching that enormity can seem "like an uphill battle". She noted three ways to catch up: Critical Role's official Critical Recap videos, the fan-run website "CritRoleStats", and traditional binge-watching. Turney also wrote that viewers should enjoy the show at "their own pace" and "not stress about completing all episodes" within a set period of time; additionally, there are many "Critical Role summaries and recaps" online for those "who want to quickly catch up to a certain arc". 

Critics also commented on the campaign's various plot twists and revelations, with a particular emphasis on Mollymauk's death and the return of his body in the form of the antagonist Lucien. Tyler Wilde, writing for PC Gamer in 2018, said Molly's death impacted both the cast and the community with the Twitch audience left "inconsolable". Wilde commented that it showcases the difference between live and scripted shows – "it was heartbreaking, but chance is partly what makes Critical Role and other tabletop gaming shows alluring". Wilde also highlighted that the player character death changed how "play is interpreted" as with the addition of proven mortality, recklessness feels like a bolder choice by the players.  Margarida Bastos included Molly's funeral on Collider's "9 Most Memorable Moments From Critical Role's The Mighty Nein" list stating that "it's impossible not to be moved by the actors' heartfelt performances. Moreover, the fact that Molly's funeral acquires a whole new connotation almost a hundred episodes later, establishes the full relevance of this moment in the grander scheme of the story". Christian Hoffer of ComicBook has highlighted multiple revelations in Campaign Two, including Molly's body appearing to be alive in Episode 111. According to Hoffer, "one of the biggest twists of the series" is Molly's resurrection – "we could be heading towards another an epic storyline centered around the only Critical Role PC who died in the middle of a campaign and wasn't brought back to finish his story. Madison Durham, writing for Polygon in 2022, stated that "unlike the somewhat cut-and-dried villainy of earlier Critical Role villains like Vecna, Lucien posed a particular problem for the party during his tenure" especially as the player characters "were forced to weigh the atrocity of Lucien's actions against the preciousness of his body". Several critics also highlighted how the Mighty Nein changed over the course of the campaign. Duncan found the party healing from trauma over the course of the campaign "wonderfully rewarding". Wilson stated that from the perspective of a fan:We cheered for characters in their growth and development. We got gigantic payoffs for story seeds planted literally years earlier, mysteries uncovered, and romances finally consummated. There is more heart, more pain and glory, more comedy, more tension on Critical Role every week than any other show on television. And they do it all with the most basic of methods.

Accolades

Adaptations 

Multiple spin-offs and adaptations of the campaign have been released. The campaign sourcebook Explorer's Guide to Wildemount is a guide to the fictional setting of Campaign Two. It is published by Wizards of the Coast and Critical Role. Two series of comic books expand on the campaign's setting; Critical Role: The Mighty Nein Origins focuses on the backstories of the main characters and Critical Role: The Tales of Exandria covers the side-stories of non-player characters such as Leylas Kryn, and the Bright Queen of the Kryn Dynasty and her eternal lover Quana. The novel Critical Role: The Mighty Nein – The Nine Eyes of Lucien (2022) focuses on Lucien, the tiefling antagonist of Campaign Two, and his life before and after he meets the Mighty Nein. Other products based on the campaign include the art book Critical Role: The Chronicles of Exandria The Mighty Nein, and the board game Uk'otoa.

In January 2023, it was announced that the campaign will receive an animated television adaptation for Amazon Prime Video titled Mighty Nein. The series will be executive produced by Tasha Huo, Sam Riegel, Travis Willingham, Chris Prynoski, Shannon Prynoski, Antonio Canobbio and Ben Kalina; Metapigeon, Amazon Studios, and Titmouse, Inc. will serve as the production companies.

Notes

References 

2010s YouTube series
2020s YouTube series
2
YouTube channels launched in 2018